Dhanisafa is a village in Pirojpur District in the Barisal Division of southwestern Bangladesh.

References

External links
 Satellite map at Maplandia.com

Villages in Pirojpur District
Villages in Barisal Division